Eduardo Valente da Fonseca (Aveiro, 1928–2003) is a Portuguese writer. He has collaborated on literary supplements for journals such as Comércio do Porto and the Jornal de Notícias, as well as Vértice and the Jornal de Letras. Other than writing features for journals and children's literature, he is also a poet.

His poem "Canto do Ceifeiro", with music by Francisco Fernandes was included in the LP "Cancões da Cidade Nova", by Francisco Fanhais.

External links 
(In Portuguese)
Short outlines of poetry for children and young persons in Portugal from the 1990s
Cais de Poemas

1928 births
2003 deaths
Portuguese male writers